The Men's marathon T12 was a marathon event in athletics at the 1996 Summer Paralympics, for visually impaired athletes. The defending champion from the 1992 Paralympics, Mark Farnell, and silver medalist Anton Sluka, returned for this year's marathon. Farnell failed to defend his title, and took silver, finishing 13 seconds behind Sluka, who was now representing Slovakia in its first games as an independent country. Of the ten starters, nine reached the finish line.

Results

See also
 Marathon at the Paralympics

References 

Men's marathon T12
1996 marathons
Marathons at the Paralympics
Men's marathons